Agia Marina is a town on the island of Crete in Greece. Since the 2011 local government reform it is part of the municipality Chania, of which it is a community. It is 10 km west from Chania.

References

Populated places in Chania (regional unit)